Famous people from Epsom include those born here:
James Chuter Ede, former Home Secretary, born in Epsom in 1882
Terence Reese, bridge player, in 1913
Petula Clark, singer, born in Epsom in 1932
 Freya Smith Dinshah, vegan activist, cofounder and current President, American Vegan Society, born in Epsom, 1941
Sarah Miles, actress, born in Epsom, 1941
Glyn Johns, recording engineer and record producer, in 1942
James Whale, 1951, broadcaster, born in Ewell Village and attended Longmead Boys' School
Jane Hutt, Labour politician serving as Member of the Welsh Parliament for the Vale of Glamorgan since 1999, was born here in 1949 
Andy Ward, drummer from the band Camel, in 1952
 Bobby G, vocalist with band Bucks Fizz, in 1953
Ian McKay (formerly Ian Laidlaw), art critic and writer, born here in 1962
Andrew Castle, GMTV presenter, was born in Epsom in 1963
Alex Kingston, actress, ER attended Rosebery was born here in 1963
Julia Ormond, actress born in Epsom in 1965
Jeremy Vine, BBC Radio 2 presenter was born in Epsom in 1965
Michaela Strachan, TV broadcaster, was born in Ewell in 1966
Simon Starling, Turner Prize 'Shedboatshed' winner, born 1967
Mel Giedroyc, actress and comedian in 1968
Nici Sterling, adult film actress in 1968
Warwick Davis, actor (Star Wars, Willow) in 1970
Rebecca Carrington, comedian in 1971
Alex Inglethorpe, footballer in 1971
Neal Ardley, footballer in 1972
Nick Easter, England international rugby union player, born 1978
Paul Hodgson, England international rugby union player, born in 1982
Tom Szekeres, actor, in 1983
Freddy Eastwood, footballer, born in Epsom in 1984
Sam Smith, rugby union player for Harlequins, born 1990
Rory Burns, England international cricketer, born 1990
Dom Sibley, England international cricketer, born 1995
Tyger Drew-Honey, who plays Jake in TV comedy Outnumbered was born in Epsom in 1996, and attended Epsom College.
 Catherine McCormack
 Andy Johns, record producer, sound engineer
 Thomas Mayr-Harting, former Ambassador of the European Union to the United Nations 
 Martin Parr, photographer
 John Piper, painter and printmaker
 Isabella Potbury, portrait painter and suffragette 
 Kathleen Riddick, British conductor
 Joe Wicks, fitness coach

Famous people from Epsom who resided here include:
Isabella Beeton, writer famous for Mrs Beeton's Book of Household Management, lived for a while at her stepfather's house in Epsom
Sally Mapp (-1737) bonesetter
John Parkhurst (1728-1797) academic, clergyman and lexicographer
Jonathan Boucher (1738-1804 clergyman, teacher, philologist
Archibald Primrose, 5th Earl of Rosebery (1847-1929) Prime Minister of the United Kingdom and Liberal Party MP
Jimmy White, snooker player, lives in Epsom
Norman Wisdom, comic actor lived in Epsom until his health declined and his family sold the flat in the early 2000s
Frank Hampson (1918-1985) cartoonist and illustrator
Jimmy Page, rock guitarist, founding member Led Zeppelin
Alec Stock, former Queens Park Rangers and Fulham manager lived in Ashley Road, Epsom
Kenneth Wolstenholme, sports broadcaster, lived by Epsom & Ewell FC grounds in West Street, Ewell for many years
Bob Pearson, singer and pianist (of double act Bob and Alf Pearson), lived in Epsom in the 1960s
Stanley Baker, actor, lived in Epsom for many years
Rose Scott-Moncrieff, biochemist, died in Epsom
Colin Southgate, businessman
Ron Harris, Chelsea F.C. defender, nicknamed Chopper, lived in West Gardens, The Headway and his parents ran a sweet shop on Ruxley Lane in the 1960s and 1970s
David Charles Manners, theatre designer, author and charity founder lived in Hookfield and was educated at Ebbisham.
Joe Strummer, lead singer and co-founder of The Clash
John Challis, actor, resided on the Woodcote Estate in Epsom as a child.
Nadia Essex, TV personality
Tim Palmer, music producer and mixer went to Glyn School and Ewell Castle.
Famous people, past and present who are associated with Epsom include:
Jack Ashley, Labour MP now Baron Ashley of Stoke
Efan Ekoku, footballer
Tom Felton, actor
Evelyn Glennie, musician, attended Rosebery
Tim Vine, comic actor
Ameet Chana, actor
Jody Morris, footballer, grew up on the Longmead Estate
Stedman Pearson, singer/member of the pop group Five Star, attended Laine Theatre Arts
See also: winners of The Derby; Epsom College and Rosebery School
 Andrew Garfield, actor, (The Amazing Spider-Man, The Social Network)
 David Vine, TV broadcaster
 Louis Cole, YouTuber  
 Peter Xavier Price, illustrator and academic
 Steven Savile, writer
 Nici Sterling, adult film actor
 Johnny Haynes, professional footballer

References

 
Epsom